Mazan Pad (also Romanized as Mazan Pād; also known as Delegān-e Mazan Far, Mazan Pādak, and Mazan Pat) is a village in Negur Rural District, Dashtiari District, Chabahar County, Sistan and Baluchestan Province, Iran. At the 2006 census, its population was 301, in 61 families.

References 

Populated places in Chabahar County